The Sultan is a Turkish breed of crested chicken. The name derives from the original Turkish language name of Sarai-Tavuk, which translates as "fowls of the palace". They have always been primarily ornamental, having been kept in the gardens of Ottoman sultanate. In the West they are bred for competitive showing as part of poultry fancy, and are generally a rare sight.

The breed was first exported from its native country in 1854, when a Ms. Elizabeth Watts of Hampstead, London brought a small flock to Britain. It was seen in North America by 1867, and was recognized officially by acceptance into the American Poultry Association's Standard of Perfection in 1874. 

Sultans have a great deal of decorative plumage, including large, puffy crests, beards, long tails, and profuse foot feathering. Their small, V-shaped combs are almost entirely hidden under feathering. Sultans are also one of a minority of breeds to have five toes on each foot. With males weighing approximately 2.7 kilos (6 pounds) and hens 2 kilos (4 pounds), they are the smallest of the large breeds of chickens. They also have a bantam version. 

Sultans appear in three varieties: black, blue, and white, with white being the most well known. Hens lay small white eggs at a slow rate, and do not generally go broody.

References 

Chicken breeds
Chicken breeds originating in Turkey
Animal breeds on the RBST Watchlist